The Australian Athletics Championships or Australian Open Track and Field Championships are held annually to determine Australia's champion athletes in a range of athletics events.  The championships are the primary qualification trial for athletes wishing to compete at the Olympic Games, Commonwealth Games or World Championships. The event is conducted by Athletics Australia. Athletes from other countries such as New Zealand and the USA have competed in and won events.

History
The championships were first held on 31 May 1890 under the name Inter Colonial Meet at Moore Park in Sydney.

In 1893, teams from the Australasian colonies of New South Wales, Victoria, Queensland and New Zealand competed in the first formalised Australasian Athletics Championships meeting.

A New Zealand team continued to compete in this event until the 1927/28 event. At the next championships in 1929/30, women's events were included for the first time.

In 1933, the women began conducting their own championships, with a wider range of events. Except for occasional combined championships in 1936, 1972 and 1976, the separation of men's and women's championships continued until the 1977/78 event.

Championship events
The full range of Olympic events is not usually conducted at the national championships. For example, during the 2007/08 season the following championship events were held separately:

 Men's and Women's 10,000 metres Zatopek Classic 13 December 2007
 Men's 50 kilometres race walk Melbourne 16 December 2007
 Women's 5000 metres Sydney Grand Prix 16 February 2008
 Men's 5000 metres IAAF World Athletics Tour, Melbourne meet 21 February 2008
 Men's and Women's 20 kilometres race walk Melbourne 23 February 2008

Most successful athletes

The most successful athletes at the Championships have been throwers Gael Martin and Warwick Selvey who won 20 and 19 championships events, respectively.

List of championships

Notes

Championships records

Women

References

 
Athletics
Athletics competitions in Australia
National athletics competitions
Recurring events established in 1890
1890 establishments in Australia